The Fiddlehead is a Canadian literary magazine, published four times annually at the University of New Brunswick. It is the oldest Canadian literary magazine which is still in circulation.

History and profile
The Fiddlehead was established in 1945 by Alfred Bailey as an in-house publication for the Bliss Carman Poetry Society. The first issue was published in February 1945. It was adapted as a general literary magazine in 1952. Other prominent contributors in the magazine's early years included Elizabeth Brewster, Fred Cogswell and Desmond Pacey.

The Fiddlehead's current editor is Ross Leckie; contributing editors include Bill Gaston, Gerard Beirne, Janice Kulyk Keefer, Don McKay and Jan Zwicky. The magazine is published quarterly.

The magazine celebrated its 70th anniversary with the Winter 2015 issue.

See also
List of literary magazines

References

External links
 

1945 establishments in New Brunswick
Literary magazines published in Canada
Magazines established in 1945
Magazines published in New Brunswick
Quarterly magazines published in Canada